Walter Copeland Jerrold (3 May 1865 – 27 October 1929) was an English writer, biographer and newspaper editor.

Early life
Jerrold was born in Liverpool, the son of Thomas Serle Jerrold and Jane Matilda Copeland (who were first cousins), and one of 11 children.  His family had strong theatrical connections: Both his grandfather Douglas William Jerrold and uncle William Blanchard Jerrold were notable dramatists, and his great grandfather Samuel Jerrold was an actor and theater manager.

Career 
Jerrold spent most of his life in London, starting work as a clerk in a newspaper counting-house, and going on to become deputy editor of The Observer. He edited many classic texts for the newly founded Everyman's Library, wrote biographies, travel books (for the "Beautiful England" series - published by Blackie and Son Limited), edited children's books, and produced stories for children under the name of Walter Copeland.

Family 
On 23 July 1895 he married Clara Armstrong Bridgeman (2 December 1861 – 1937) at Kensington Register Office. Clara was also a published author writing under the name Clare Jerrold, which included a three-volume set on the life of Queen Victoria. Together they had one son and five daughters all named after Greek mythological characters. Oliver (27 September 1896 – 3 June 1897), their first born, died in infancy. Ianthe (1898–1977), the oldest daughter, became a renowned fiction writer of twenty-one novels. Twins, Daphne (1899–1972) and Phyllis (1899–1975), attended the Slade School of Art and became painters and book illustrators. Hebe (1900–1987) was a poet and book illustrator. The youngest daughter, Althea (1902–1973) was also a talented writer and poet whose talent was overshadowed by her equally talented older siblings.

Books (selected)

Biographical

Thomas Hood: His Life and Times (London: Alston Rivers, 1907)
Michael Faraday: Man of Science (London: S.W. Partridge & Co, 1891)
Charles Lamb (London: George Bell & sons, 1905)
Douglas Jerrold, Dramatist And Wit (Hodder and Stoughton, 1914)  
Earl Kitchener of Khartoum ( W.A. Hammond, 1916)

Children
The Big Book of Fables (Lamboll, London 1987) 

Travel

Surrey (J. M. Dent and E. P. Dutton, 1901)
Highways and Byways in Kent (Macmillan & Co., 1907)
Shakespeare Land (Dana Estes & Co. Boston)
Norwich and the Broads (Blackie & Son, 1910)
The Thames (Blackie & Son, 1910)
Hampton Court (Blackie & Son, 1912)
Folkestone and Dover (Blackie & Son, 1920)
The Heart of London (Blackie and Son, Ltd, 1924)
Through London's highways (Blackie and Son, Ltd, 1924)
In London's by-ways (Blackie and Son, Ltd, 1925)
Rambles in Greater London (Blackie and Son, Ltd, 1925)

Anthology
A Century of Parody and Imitation, ed. with Robert Maynard Leonard (H. Milford, Oxford University Press, 1913; reprinted by Ulan Press, 2012)

References

External links
 Walter Jerrold (Randomhouse.com listing).
 
 
 

English male journalists
English book editors
English biographers
English children's writers
English travel writers
1865 births
1929 deaths
Male biographers